WVVV (96.9 FM) is a radio station broadcasting an adult contemporary format. Licensed to Williamstown, West Virginia, United States, it serves the Parkersburg-Marietta area.  The station is currently owned by Seven Ranges Radio Co. of St. Marys, West Virginia.

External links

VVV